Roe Rovers Football Club is a Northern Irish football club based in Limavady, County Londonderry, formerly playing in the Northern Ireland Intermediate League. The club was founded in 1998. 

The club has participated in the Irish Cup.

External links
 Club web site
 nifootball.co.uk - (For fixtures, results and tables of all Northern Ireland amateur football leagues)

References

 

Association football clubs in Northern Ireland
Association football clubs in County Londonderry
Limavady